The 1944 Soviet football championship was the 12th season of competitive football in the Soviet Union. The season consisted of a short Olympic-style (elimination) tournament played in August.

Honours

Notes = Number in parentheses is the times that club has won that honour. * indicates new record for competition

Soviet Cup

Zenit Leningrad beat CDKA Moscow 2–1 in the Soviet Cup final. The decisive goal was scored by Sergei Salnikov.

Republican level
Football competitions of union republics

Football championships
 Azerbaijan SSR – Lokomotiv Baku
 Armenian SSR – 
 Belarusian SSR – (see Football Championship of the Belarusian SSR)
 Estonian SSR – 
 Georgian SSR – 
 Kazakh SSR – 
 Karelo-Finish SSR – 
 Kirgiz SSR – 
 Latvian SSR – 
 Lithuanian SSR – 
 Moldavian SSR – 
 Russian SFSR – none
 Tajik SSR – 
 Turkmen SSR – none
 Uzbek SSR – none
 Ukrainian SSR – (see Football Championship of the Ukrainian SSR)

Football cups
 Azerbaijan SSR – none
 Armenian SSR – 
 Belarusian SSR – 
 Estonian SSR – 
 Georgian SSR – Dinamo Sukhumi
 Kazakh SSR – 
 Karelo-Finish SSR – 
 Kirgiz SSR – 
 Latvian SSR – 
 Lithuanian SSR – 
 Moldavian SSR – 
 Russian SFSR – none
 Tajik SSR – 
 Turkmen SSR – Lokomotiv Ashkhabad
 Uzbek SSR – KhTU Chirchik
 Ukrainian SSR – FC Dynamo Kyiv (see 1944 Cup of the Ukrainian SSR)

References

External links
 1944 Soviet football championship. RSSSF